Aluminium–lithium alloys (Al–Li alloys) are a set of alloys of aluminium and lithium, often also including copper and zirconium. Since lithium is the least dense elemental metal, these alloys are significantly less dense than aluminium. Commercial Al–Li alloys contain up to 2.45% lithium by mass.

Crystal structure
Alloying with lithium reduces structural mass by three effects:

 Displacement  A lithium atom is lighter than an aluminium atom; each lithium atom then displaces one aluminium atom from the crystal lattice while maintaining the lattice structure. Every 1% by mass of lithium added to aluminium reduces the density of the resulting alloy by 3% and increases the stiffness by 5%. This effect works up to the solubility limit of lithium in aluminium, which is 4.2%.
 Strain hardening Introducing another type of atom into the crystal strains the lattice, which helps block dislocations. The resulting material is thus stronger, which allows less of it to be used.
 Precipitation hardening When properly aged, lithium forms a metastable Al3Li phase (δ') with a coherent crystal structure. These precipitates strengthen the metal by impeding dislocation motion during deformation. The precipitates are not stable, however, and care must be taken to prevent overaging with the formation of the stable AlLi (β) phase. This also produces precipitate free zones (PFZs) typically at grain boundaries and can reduce the corrosion resistance of the alloy.

The crystal structure for Al3Li and Al–Li, while based on the FCC crystal system, are very different. Al3Li shows almost the same-size lattice structure as pure aluminium, except that lithium atoms are present in the corners of the unit cell. The Al3Li structure is known as the AuCu3, L12, or Pmm and has a lattice parameter of 4.01 Å. The Al–Li structure is known as the NaTl, B32, or Fdm structure, which is made of both lithium and aluminium assuming diamond structures and has a lattice parameter of 6.37 Å. The interatomic spacing for Al–Li (3.19 Å) is smaller than either pure lithium or aluminium.

Usage
Al–Li alloys are primarily of interest to the aerospace industry for their weight advantage. On narrow-body airliners, Arconic (formerly Alcoa) claims up to 10% weight reduction compared to composites, leading to up to 20% better fuel efficiency, at a lower cost than titanium or composites. Aluminium–lithium alloys were first used in the wings and horizontal stabilizer of the North American A-5 Vigilante military aircraft. Other Al–Li alloys have been employed in the lower wing skins of the Airbus A380, the inner wing structure of the Airbus A350, the fuselage of the Bombardier CSeries (where the alloys make up 24% of the fuselage), the cargo floor of the Boeing 777X, and the fan blades of the Pratt & Whitney PurePower geared turbofan aircraft engine. They are also used in the fuel and oxidizer tanks in the SpaceX Falcon 9 launch vehicle, Formula One brake calipers, and the AgustaWestland EH101 helicopter.

The third and final version of the US Space Shuttle's external tank was principally made of Al–Li 2195 alloy. In addition, Al–Li alloys are also used in the Centaur Forward Adapter in the Atlas V rocket, in the Orion Spacecraft, and were to be used in the planned Ares I and Ares V rockets (part of the cancelled Constellation program).

Al–Li alloys are generally joined by friction stir welding. Some Al–Li alloys, such as Weldalite 049, can be welded conventionally; however, this property comes at the price of density; Weldalite 049 has about the same density as 2024 aluminium and 5% higher elastic modulus.

Although aluminium–lithium alloys are generally superior to aluminium–copper or aluminium–zinc alloys in ultimate strength-to-weight ratio, their poor fatigue strength under compression remains a problem, which is only partially solved as of 2016. Also, high costs (around 3 times or more than for conventional aluminium alloys), poor corrosion resistance, and strong anisotropy of mechanical properties of rolled aluminium–lithium products has resulted in a paucity of applications.

List of aluminium–lithium alloys
Aside from its formal four-digit designation derived from its element composition, an aluminium–lithium alloy is also associated with particular generations, based primarily on when it was first produced, but secondarily on its lithium content. The first generation lasted from the initial background research in the early 20th century to their first aircraft application in the middle 20th century. Consisting of alloys that were meant to replace the popular 2024 and 7075 alloys directly, the second generation of Al–Li had high lithium content of at least 2%; this characteristic produced a large reduction in density but resulted in some negative effects, particularly in fracture toughness. The third generation is the current generation of Al–Li product that is available, and it has gained wide acceptance by aircraft manufacturers, unlike the previous two generations.

First-generation alloys (1920s–1960s)

Second-generation alloys (1970s–1980s)

Third-generation alloys (1990s–2010s)

Other alloys 
 1424 aluminium alloy
 1429 aluminium alloy
 1441K aluminium alloy
 1445 aluminium alloy
 V-1461 aluminium alloy
 V-1464 aluminium alloy
 V-1469 aluminium alloy
 V-1470 aluminium alloy
 2094 aluminium alloy
 2095 aluminium alloy (Weldalite 049)
 2097 aluminium alloy
 2197 aluminium alloy
 8025 aluminium alloy
 8091 aluminium alloy
 8093 aluminium alloy
 CP 276

Production sites
Key world producers of aluminium–lithium alloy products are Arconic, Constellium, and Kamensk-Uralsky Metallurgical Works.

 Arconic Technical Center (Upper Burrell, Pennsylvania, USA)
 Arconic Kitts Green (United Kingdom)
 Rio Tinto Alcan Dubuc Plant (Canada); capacity 
 Constellium Issoire (Puy-de-Dôme), France; annual capacity of 
 Kamensk-Uralsky Metallurgical Works (KUMZ)
 Aleris (Koblenz, Germany)
 FMC Corporation
 Southwest Aluminium (PRC)

See also
 Aluminium alloy
 Magnesium–lithium alloys
 GLARE
 Carbon fiber reinforced plastic (CFRP)

References

Bibliography

External links 
 
 

Lithium
Lithium